Lomelosia prolifera, the Carmel daisy, is a flowering plant of the family Caprifoliaceae. Its flowers in February to May, are creamy yellow, and when the petals are shed they leave a greenish-looking dried flower, good for arrangements. It is native to the eastern Mediterranean. 

It is an annual, growing up to 40 cm high. It has erect stem with soft, rather long, whitish hairs. The leaves are arranged opposite, simple, entire or irregularly dentate, pale green and hairy on both surfaces. The flowers are zygomorphic and hermaphrodite, 
After flowering it produces an Achene.

It was first published in Willdenowia vol.15 on page 75 in 1985.

It is found in Cyprus, East Aegean Islands, Egypt, Lebanon, Syria, Palestine and Turkey.

Habitat:  Waste ground, roadsides, grassy slopes, fields, 0-1500 m alt.

References

External links
 Jerusalem Botanic Garden

Flora of Israel
Flora of Lebanon and Syria
Flora of Palestine (region)
Flora of Cyprus
Flora of Turkey
Flora of Egypt
Plants described in 1985
Taxa named by Carl Linnaeus